Zaldiaran is a mountain in the Montes de Vitoria range, in the province of Álava, Basque Country, Spain. Even if part of the south face of the mountain is on the Treviño exclave, Burgos; the summit itself lies in Álava. At the top of the mountain, apart from a tall metallic cross that was placed in 1950 by the Manuel Iradier hiking club, there are a few big aerials that transmit television and radio signal to Vitoria-Gasteiz.

The roads that communicate the two provinces are the A-3102 in Álava and the BU-742 in Treviño. The northern slopes are covered by beeches (Fagus sylvatica) that give way to Portuguese oak (Quercus faginea) woods on the lower parts.

Due to the proximity of the summit to Vitoria-Gasteiz and its easy access, it is popular among hikers. On New Year's Day, the hiking clubs of the city organize hikes to the mountain to celebrate the new year.

Access points and trails
The most popular trail starts in Berrostegieta, on the road that leads to the Zaldiaran pass. This route goes through the secondary Errogana summit. Another popular starting point is the nearby hamlet of Eskibel. The shortest route starts at the Zaldiaran pass, and follows the paved track that leads to the summit.

References

External links
 
 Zaldiaran at the Mendikat website 

Basque Mountains
Mountains of Álava
Mountains of the Basque Country (autonomous community)